Jean Blaise Bouli (born 4 September 1980) is a retired Cameroonian footballer.

Previously he played for FC Jūrmala in Latvia. He played 9 games, scoring no goals.

External links
  Player page on the official FC Terek Grozny website
 
 

1980 births
Living people
Cameroonian footballers
Cameroonian expatriate footballers
Union Douala players
Getafe CF footballers
FC Akhmat Grozny players
Expatriate footballers in Spain
Expatriate footballers in Russia
Russian Premier League players
FC Luch Vladivostok players
FC Nizhny Novgorod (2007) players
Expatriate footballers in Latvia
FC Jūrmala players
Association football midfielders
FC Dynamo Bryansk players